Luiz Felipe Agostin Outerelo (born 11 December 1991) is a Brazilian diver. He competed in the men's synchronized three metre springboard event at the 2016 Summer Olympics.

References

External links
 

1991 births
Living people
Brazilian male divers
Olympic divers of Brazil
Divers at the 2016 Summer Olympics
Divers from Rio de Janeiro (city)
Sportspeople from Rio de Janeiro (city)
21st-century Brazilian people